Alireza Soleimani is an Iranian wrestler.

Alireza Soleimani may also refer to:
 Alireza Soleimani (weightlifter), Iranian weightlifter.